XHDCC-FM is a community radio station on 97.3 FM in San Ildefonso, Tepeji del Río de Ocampo, Hidalgo. XHDCC is owned by Desarrollo Comunitario y Cultural Ma Nguhe, A.C. and primarily broadcasts in Hñähñu.

History
The station first went on air with transmitter tests in 2002, but its equipment was seized and the station forced off air. That forced the backers of Desarrollo Comunitario y Cultural Ma Nguhe, A.C. to begin the process of applying for a permit at a time when there were very few permitted community radio stations in Mexico.

On July 29, 2005, Ma Nguhe received the permit for their station, XHDCC-FM; it had to buy a new transmitter to replace the one that was seized, and full programming began August 1, 2006. XHDCC is licensed for operation from 1pm to 10pm each day.

References

Radio stations in Hidalgo (state)
Community radio stations in Mexico
Otomi-language radio stations
Radio stations established in 2002